Back on the Scene is an album by American trombonist Bennie Green recorded in 1958 and released on the Blue Note label.

Reception

The AllMusic review by Stephen Thomas Erlewine awarded the album 3 stars and stated "It's evident from the opening pair of Latin-flavored performances that Back on the Scene is one of Bennie Green's most diverse efforts. Green's warm, supple tone and fondness for swinging, bop-influenced mainstream jazz and jump blues hasn't disappeared; he's just found new facets in his style... Even with this vast array of styles, Back on the Scene retains all the good-natured spirit and humor of his earlier Prestige albums."

Track listing
 "I Love You" (Cole Porter) - 6:08
 "Melba's Mood" (Melba Liston) - 5:35
 "Just Friends" (John Klenner, Sam M. Lewis) - 7:03
 "You're Mine, You" (Johnny Green, Edward Heyman) - 5:18
 "Bennie Plays the Blues" (Bennie Green) - 8:25
 "Green Street" (Liston)  5:09
Recorded at Van Gelder Studio, Hackensack, New Jersey on March 23, 1958.

Personnel
Bennie Green - trombone
Charlie Rouse - tenor saxophone
Joe Knight - piano
George Tucker - bass
Louis Hayes - drums

References 

Blue Note Records albums
Bennie Green albums
1958 albums
Albums recorded at Van Gelder Studio